Aminata Kamissoko (born 9 July 1985) is a Mauritanian sprint athlete.

In 2003 Kamissoko competed at the 2003 World Championships in Athletics held in France, she ran in the 100 metres where she ran a time of 13.70 seconds and came 7th in her heat so didn't qualify for the next round, 12 months later she became only the second ever female competitor to represent her country at the Summer Olympics, when she competed at the 2004 Summer Olympics in the 100 metres, she ran in a time of 13.49 seconds and came 8th in her heat, so again didn't qualify for the next round.

References

1985 births
Living people
Mauritanian female sprinters
Olympic athletes of Mauritania
Athletes (track and field) at the 2004 Summer Olympics
Olympic female sprinters